Gottfried Daniel Berger (25 October 1744 - 17 November 1825) was a German engraver.

Born in Berlin, Berger was the son of Friedrich Gottlieb Berger who was also an engraver. In 1757 Berger was being instructed by the French painter Blaise Nicholas Le Sueur, who at the time was the director of the Prussian Academy of Arts. In May 1774, his training was further supplemented by Georg Friedrich Schmidt until the artist's death eight months later. Berger received professional support from Le Sueur, who provided contacts with influential figures including the painter and director of the Sanssouci Picture Gallery Matthias of Austria, the bank director and art connoisseur Carl Philipp Caesar and anatomy professor Johann Friedrich Meckel. In this way, Berger received numerous important commissions, such as the production of illustrations for medical and biological works or reproductions of paintings.

In 1778, Berger was a full member of the Academy of Arts, and in 1787 he was inducted into the rectorship and was appointed professor of engraving. In 1816, Berger became Vice Director of the Academy. He died November 17, 1825 in Berlin.

References

 Carl Ludwig Oesfeld, August Wilhelm Crayen: display of all the works of Mr. Daniel Berger, rector and teacher of engraving art bey of the Royal Prussian Academy of Arts and Mechanical Sciences. No. I. published with permission of the artist and arranged in chronological order. In addition to his likeness. Rostische art dealer, Leipzig 1792nd
 Joseph Heller: A practical handbook for engraving collector Or Lexicon of the most distinguished and popular engraver, form cutters, lithographers Etc. Etc. : Apart from giving your best and application testing sheets, the difference of the footprints of measure, The Shop-And Antiquarian prices, As well as the auction price them into the important of Auctionen Germany And The foreign countries; Besides a chronological lists of the engraver, etc., and the portrait of the author . Second completely revised and greatly enlarged edition. Publisher T. O. Weigel, Leipzig 1850th
 Robert Dohme: Berger, Daniel. In: General German Biography (ADB). Volume 2 Oxford University Press, Leipzig, 1875, pp. 373 f

German engravers
1744 births
1825 deaths
Artists from Berlin
Academic staff of the Prussian Academy of Arts